The Hunt House is a historic house at 707 West Center Street in Searcy, Arkansas.  It is a -story wood-frame house, its exterior finished in brick, stucco, stone, and other materials.  It is roughly T-shaped, with intersecting gable-roofed sections.  The front-facing gable has the entry porch projecting from its left front, and a chimney to its right.  Both are formed out of brick with randomly placed stone at the lower levels, and stuccoed brick at the upper levels.   Built about 1935, it is one of Searcy's finer examples of English Revival architecture.

The house was listed on the National Register of Historic Places in 1991.

See also
National Register of Historic Places listings in White County, Arkansas

References

Houses on the National Register of Historic Places in Arkansas
Houses completed in 1935
Houses in Searcy, Arkansas
National Register of Historic Places in Searcy, Arkansas
1935 establishments in Arkansas
Tudor Revival architecture in Arkansas